Bullet for Hire is a 1991 Hong Kong action film written and directed by Yuen Chun-man and starring Jacky Cheung, Simon Yam, Dick Wei, Lo Lieh and Sheila Chan.

Plot
Triad assassins Ngok (Lo Lieh), Hon (Simon Yam) and Shan (Jacky Cheung) are struggling in a battle for money and power in Hong Kong. Ngok and Hon has worked for triad boss Dick (Dick Wei) for over ten years and the two have established a profound friendship. Because they were clever, the two were heavily utilized by Dick. However, Ngok is getting old and worried that Dick will harm his only daughter, San (Elaine Chow). With the help of the police, Ngok was able to fake his death during an assassination attempt.

Shan, on the other hand, is a newcomer killer. While following Hon, Shan gets to learn about the fickleness of the world. One time after winning HK$100,000 from a bet, he encounters a message girl, Lan (Sheila Chan) and develops a romantic relationship with her. At this time, Dick suspects about Ngok's death and sends Hon and Shan to kill him. Dick also kidnaps Lan to blackmail Shan and at this critical moment of deciding the fate of three of them, the choices of life and death are in front of them.

Cast
Jacky Cheung as Shan
Simon Yam as Hon
Dick Wei as Mr. Dick
Lo Lieh as Ngok
Sheila Chan as Lan
Elaine Lui as Interpol officer
Elaine Chow as San
Lam Chung as Bill (cameo)
Ma Kei as Kwai (cameo)
Hung San-sam as Ngok's victim in flashback
Wan Seung-lam as Mr. Dick's thug
Lee Chun-kit as Mr. Dick's thug
Paul Wong as Mr. Dick's thug
Wong Chi-keung as Mr. Dick's thug
Lung Tin-sang as Boss playing darts in pub
Johnny Cheung as Boss's thug/Mr. Dick's thug
Ridley Tsui as Boss's thug
Johnny Yip
Tam Chuen-leung
Danny Chow as one of Kwai's men
Tam Chuen-hing as Superintendent Henry Tso Hon
Jameson Lam as Restaurant captain
Ken Yip as Ngai Chai-wan's bodyguard
Tsim Siu-ling
Hung Yan-yan
Roger Thomas as Mr. Wilson
Johnny Koo as Kau
Huang Kai Sen as Assassin
Benny Lai as Boss's thug
Ka See-fung as Boss's thug
Hon Chun as Boss's thug
Kwok Nga-cheung

Theme song
Resurrection (復活)
Composer: Donald Ashley
Lyricist: Calvin Poon
Singer: Jacky Cheung

Reception

Critical
City On Fire gave the film a score of 8/10 and writes "It's an erratic, irreverent, almost anything goes flick with comedy that's actually comical and some explosive action sequences that get the squibs bursting."

Box office
The film grossed HK$3,646,104 at the Hong Kong box office during its theatrical run from 5 to 11 September 1991 in Hong Kong.

See also
Jacky Cheung filmography
Lo Lieh filmography

References

External links

Bullet for Hire at Hong Kong Cinemagic

1991 films
1991 action films
1990s buddy films
1991 martial arts films
1990s Cantonese-language films
Films about contract killing
Films set in Hong Kong
Films shot in Hong Kong
Gun fu films
Hong Kong action films
Hong Kong buddy films
Hong Kong martial arts films
Triad films
1990s Hong Kong films